A list of films produced by the Marathi language film industry based in Maharashtra in the year 1937.

1937 Releases
A list of Marathi films released in 1937.

References

External links
Gomolo - 

Lists of 1937 films by country or language
1937
1937 in Indian cinema